CFRP may refer to:

 Carbon fiber reinforced polymer, a material
 CFRP-FM, a radio rebroadcaster (100.5 FM) licensed to Forestville, Quebec, Canada